The Chase is the second studio album by Illy. The album was released in October 2010 with an online countdown track by track. It includes collaborations with Owl Eyes, Hue Blanes, Wren, Oliver Daysoul and Joyride. The bulk of the album was once again produced by M-Phazes. Three singles were  released from the album, "The Chase", "It Can Wait" and "Cigarettes". "It Can Wait" was listed at #29 on the Triple J Hottest 100, 2010.

Track listing
 "Go"
 "Guess I Could"
 "It Can Wait" (featuring Owl Eyes)
 "On the Bus"
 "Cigarettes" (featuring Hue Blanes)
 "Without a Doubt"
 "We Don't Care"
 "Numbers Game"
 "Feel Something"
 "Put Em in the Air"
 "Diamonds" (featuring Wren)
 "The Chase" (featuring Olivier Daysoul)
 "I Know" (featuring Joyride)
 "Same Number, Same Hood"

Charts

References

2010 albums
Illy (rapper) albums
Albums produced by M-Phazes
Obese Records albums